Primera Iglesia Bautista de Caguas, or Caguas’ First Baptist Church, was built in 1909.  It was listed on the National Register of Historic Places in 2008.

The church was founded in 1900.

The church is notable as a "beautiful example of Romanesque Revival architecture."

See also
National Register of Historic Places listings in Caguas, Puerto Rico

References

External links
PIB Caguas, official site 

Caguas, Puerto Rico
Churches completed in 1909
Churches on the National Register of Historic Places in Puerto Rico
Baptist churches in North America
1909 establishments in Puerto Rico
Romanesque Revival architecture